The Canal latéral à la Loire ("canal parallel to the Loire") was constructed between 1827 and 1838 to connect the Canal de Briare at Briare and the Canal du Centre at Digoin, a distance of . It replaced the use of the river Loire, which was unreliable during winter floods and summer droughts. Aqueducts were used to cross the Allier at Le Guétin (in the commune of Cuffy) and the Loire at Digoin. However, because of the extreme length required, an aqueduct was not built to cross the Loire at Briare until 1896, when the Briare aqueduct was constructed.

History
By the late 18th century with the completion of the Canal du Centre, the Bourbonnais route from the Seine to the Saône was substantially the same as at present, except for the use of the navigable Loire between Briare and Digoin. The introduction of steam haulage and dredging failed to produce the reliability of the canals, so it was in 1822  that the order to build was finally given to the Compagnie des Quatre Canaux. Although the original intention was to place the canal on the right bank, the towns of Nevers, la Charité and Cosne had no room for a canal and eventually construction started in 1827 on a canal on the left bank. Two massive stone aqueducts were built at Digoin and at Guétin to avoid level crossings of rivers with length 243m and 470m respectively, but this was not possible at Briare because of the danger of blocking the river during flood periods.

With the adoption of the Freycinet gauge in 1879, and the upgrading of the canal system, the frequent delays of several days to cross the Loire at Briare became intolerable. The Briare aqueduct was built over the Loire in Briare between 1890 and 1896 by the engineer Abel Mazoyer to make a connection with the Canal de Briare four locks up from its initial entrance. The Briare aqueduct stands on fourteen piers. These support a single metal beam carrying a trough with more than 13,000 tonnes of water, 2.2 metres deep. The width of the aqueduct, towpaths included, is 11.5 meters and its length is 662.7 meters. Eight sluices make it possible to empty the aqueduct in the event of severe freezing.

En Route

PK 198 Briare
PK 198 Briare aqueduct
PK 192 Châtillon-sur-Loire
PK 187 left to Châtillon branch canal for access to the river Loire
PK 180 Belleville-sur-Loire
PK 175 Léré
PK 159.5 Saint-Satur or Saint-Thibault
PK 143 Herry
PK 125 Marseilles-lès-Aubigny
PK 100 Nevers
PK 68.5 Decize
PK 53 Gannay-sur-Loire
PK 41 Garnat-sur-Engievre
PK 29 Dompierre-sur-Besbre right canal branch to Dompierre-sur-Besbre
PK 15 Coulanges
PK 4 Digoin 
PK 0 continues as Canal du Centre

See also
List of canals in France

References

External links
 Friends of the canal
 Grehan - Afloat in France information

Loire
Canals opened in 1838
1838 establishments in France